"Nearly Lost You" is a song by the American alternative rock group Screaming Trees. It was the first single released in support of their sixth album, Sweet Oblivion. Perhaps their best-known song, it was a moderate success on modern rock radio, partly because of its appearance on the soundtrack to the 1992 Cameron Crowe film Singles.

Formats and track listing 
UK 12" single (659179 6)
"Nearly Lost You" (Gary Lee Conner, Van Conner, Mark Lanegan) – 4:06
"E.S.K." (Gary Lee Conner, Mark Lanegan) – 4:09
"Song of a Baker" (Small Faces cover) (Ronnie Lane, Steve Marriott) – 3:41
"Bed of Roses" (Gary Lee Conner, Van Conner, Mark Lanegan) – 3:02

US 7" single (659179 7)
"Nearly Lost You" (edit) (Gary Lee Conner, Van Conner, Mark Lanegan) – 3:40
"Nearly Lost You" (Gary Lee Conner, Van Conner, Mark Lanegan) – 4:06

US CD single (658918 2)
"Nearly Lost You" (Gary Lee Conner, Van Conner, Mark Lanegan) – 4:06
"E.S.K." (Gary Lee Conner, Mark Lanegan) – 4:09
"Song of a Baker" (Small Faces cover) (Ronnie Lane, Steve Marriott) – 3:41

Charts

Personnel
Adapted from the Nearly Lost You liner notes.

Screaming Trees
 Gary Lee Conner – guitar
 Van Conner – bass guitar
 Mark Lanegan – lead vocals
 Barrett Martin – drums

Production and additional personnel
 John Agnello – recording
 Don Fleming – production
 Andy Wallace – mixing
 Howie Weinberg – mastering

Release history

Use in media
The song appears on the soundtrack to the 2007 baseball video game The Bigs and is available as downloadable content for the Rock Band series. It is also featured in the main soundtrack of Guitar Hero 5.

References

External links 
 

1992 songs
1992 singles
Screaming Trees songs
Song recordings produced by Don Fleming (musician)
Songs written by Gary Lee Conner
Songs written by Van Conner
Songs written by Mark Lanegan
Epic Records singles
American hard rock songs